Skellig Michael, also called Great Skellig, is a twin-pinnacled crag  west of the Iveragh Peninsula in County Kerry, Ireland. The island is named after the archangel Michael, with "Skellig" derived from the Irish language word , meaning a splinter of stone. Its twin island, Little Skellig, is smaller and inaccessible (landing is not permitted). The two islands rose c. 374–360 million years ago during a period of mountain formation, along with the MacGillycuddy's Reeks mountain range. Later, they were separated from the mainland by rising water levels.

The island is defined by its twin peaks and intervening valley (known as Christ's Saddle), which make its landscape steep and inhospitable. It is best known for its Gaelic monastery, founded between the 6th and 8th centuries, and its variety of inhabiting species, which include gannets, puffins, a colony of razorbills and a population of approximately fifty grey seals. The island is of special interest to archaeologists, as the monastic settlement is in unusually good condition. The rock contains the remains of a tower house, a megalithic stone row and a cross-inscribed slab known as the Wailing Woman.

The monastery can be approached by narrow and steep flights of stone steps which ascend from three landing points. The hermitage on the south peak contains a dangerous approach and is largely closed to the public. Because of the often difficult crossing from the mainland and the exposed nature of the landing spots, the island is accessible only during summer months. UNESCO designated Skellig Michael a World Heritage Site in 1996.

Etymology

The word "Skellig" derives from the old Irish word sceillec, which translates as "small or steep area of rock". The word is unusual in Irish placenames, and appears only in few other instances, including Bunskellig, County Cork, and the Temple-na-Skellig church in Glendalough, County Wicklow. It may be of Old Norse origin, from the word skellingar ("the resounding ones"). An early but rarely used alternative Irish name for the island is Glascarraig ("the green rock").

The first known reference to the Skelligs appears in the Irish annals; a retelling of a shipwreck occurring around 1400 BC, said to have been caused by the Tuatha Dé Danann, a supernatural race in Irish mythology. According to legend, Irr, son of Míl Espáine (who is sometimes credited with the colonisation of Ireland), was travelling from the Iberian Peninsula, but drowned and was buried on the island. Daire Domhain ("King of the World") is said to have stayed there c. 200 AD before attacking Fionn mac Cumhaill's army in nearby Ventry. A text from the 8th or 9th century records that Duagh, King of West Munster, fled to "Scellecc" after a feud with the Kings of Cashel sometime in the 5th century, although the historicity of the event has not been established. Other early mentions include in the narrative prose of the Lebor Gabála Érenn and Cath Finntrágha, as well the medieval Martyrology of Tallaght.

Geography

Its twin island, Little Skellig, is a mile closer to land, and far more inhospitable, because of its sheer cliff faces. The small Lemon Rock island is  further inland. The nearby Puffin Island is another seabird colony. The Skelligs, along with some of the Blasket Islands, constitute the most westerly part of both Ireland and Europe excluding Iceland.

The island is defined by its two peaks: the north-east summit where the monastery is built (185 metres above sea level), and the south-west point containing the hermitage (218 metres above sea level). These elevations reside on either side of a depression colloquially known as Christ's Saddle.

Geology
The islands are composed of Old Red Sandstone and compressed slate, and were formed between 360 and 374 million years ago, as part of the rising of the MacGillycuddy's Reeks and Caha Mountains mountains ranges. This occurred during the Devonian period when Ireland was part of a larger continental landmass and located south of the equator. The region's topography of peaks and valleys are characterised by steep ridges formed during the Hercynian period of folding and mountain formation some 300 million years ago. When the Atlantic ocean level rose, it created deep marine inlets such as Bantry Bay and left the Skelligs detached from the mainland. The rock is highly compressed and contains numerous fracture lines and jointing. As a result of erosion along a major north–south-trending fault line containing bedrock much more brittle than that on surrounding areas, a large part of the rock broke away, resulting in Christ's Saddle, the depression between the peaks. The island's rock is deeply eroded through exposure to wind and water.

It is the only flat and fertile part of the island, and thus contains traces of medieval crop farming. The path from the Saddle to the summit is known as the Way of the Christ, a nomenclature that reflects the danger presented to climbers. Further up is the Stone of Pain area, including the station known as the Spit, a long and narrow fragment of rock approached by  steps. The ruin of the medieval church is lower and approached before the older monastery.

Bays
The island's three main bays are Blind Man's Cove to the east, Cross Cove to the south and Blue Cove to the north. Each can be used as access points from the sea. All three have steps carved into the rock from their landing point to above sea level. The main landing cove is on the recesses of the eastern side; known as Blind Man's Cove, it is exposed to sea swells and high waves, making approach difficult outside the summer months. The bay's pier is positioned under a sheer cliff face, populated by large numbers of birds. It was built in 1826 from an area known as the Flagstaff and leads to a small stairway leading to the now disused lighthouse. The steps divide into two staircases, the earliest and largely abandoned path leading directly to the monastery.

Blue Cove is the most difficult landing point and is only approachable on an average of 20 days per year. Noting the inaccessibility of the island, writer Des Lavelle observes that "the fact that the monks of old undertook the giant task of constructing a stairway to this bleak cove is a good argument that the weather conditions then were far better than now."

Demographics

Ecology

Skellig Michael is lined by exposed sea cliffs and three bays. Its inland is mostly of thin soil on steep ground, with patches of vegetation which are, however, exposed to sea spray. Nonetheless, it has an ecology far more diverse than on the mainland; as an island, it provides sanctuary to wide varieties of flora and fauna, many of which are unusual to Ireland. It contains a large range of seabirds, now protected by the island's status as a nature reserve owned by the state. The Skellig Islands were classified as a Special Protection Area in 1986 when they were recognised for containing an unusually large variety and population of birds.

The island hosts eyries for peregrine falcons. Other birds of interest include fulmars, Manx shearwaters (Puffinus puffinus), storm petrels, gannets, kittiwakes, guillemots and Atlantic puffins. A herd of goats lived on the island until recently, and it supports a population of rabbits and house mice, both relatively recent introductions, probably introduced in the 19th century by lighthouse attendants. Grey seals haul out on the island's ledges.

History

Monastic
Skellig Michael was largely uninhabited until the founding of the Augustinian monastery. Many of the islands off the west coast of Ireland contain early Christian monasteries, which were favoured because of their isolation and the abundance of rock for construction. A strong concentration of monasteries can be found off the coast of County Kerry, with nine in total found on islands off the Iveragh and Dingle peninsulas.

This establishment of a hermitage on the island was ordered by Arwystli (aka Aristobulus) who was appointed and ordained Bishop of Britain by the Apostle Paul. Arwystli was the spiritual instructor of Bran (Bran The Blessed son of Llyr Llediaith) of the Silurian dynasty. The purpose of the hermitage was the preservation of doctrine and protection of sacred texts of the Culdee church consisting of the full canon of the Essenes brought to Britain by Joseph Of Arimathea circa AD 37. The hermitage remained in use by Culdee anchorites and was visited by all the prominent Christian bards – Dewi, Teilo, and Padarn – for instruction and wisdom before their trip to Jerusalem. The hermitage was visited extensively by Cattwg Ddoeth, who took over its funding and had the first chapel built on the west side of the island. The last Culdee anchorite to live on the island was Gildas, a student of Cattwg Ddoeth. Gildas retired finally to Glastonbury where he wrote his History Of The Britons. The island remains a sacred pilgrimage site for Culdee Christians, particularly for members of the Assembly Of Christian Israelites.

The Annals of Inisfallen record a Viking attack in 823. The Annals record that “Skellig was plundered by the heathen and Eitgal [the abbot] was carried off and he died of hunger on their hands.”

The site had been dedicated to Saint Michael by at least 1044 (when the death of "Aedh of Scelic-Mhichí" is recorded). However, this dedication may have occurred as early as 950, around which time a new church was added to the monastery (typically done to celebrate a consecration) and called Saint Michael's Church. The island may have been dedicated to St. Michael, the legendary slayer of serpents, based on a connection to St. Patrick. A thirteenth-century German source claims that Skellig was the final location of the battle between St. Patrick and the venomous snakes that plagued Ireland. 

The island was a regular destination for pilgrims by the early 16th century.

Stairs and paths

Each of the three landing areas lead to long flights of steps (known as the east, south and north steps) built by the first generations of monks to inhabit the island. They may have at one time formed part of a larger network; traces of other, possibly earlier steps have been uncovered elsewhere on the island. Archaeological evidence shows that basal sections of each series of steps were rock-cut, giving way to more stable dry stone masonry once they reached an altitude where the sea waves would no longer weather them. Later the base steps were replaced with dry-stone paths.

The north steps lead from Blue Cove and consist of two long and steep continuous flights known as the upper and lower steps. The upper pathway was built from dry stone but in places is in very poor condition; given the steep face on which they are built, they are prone to erosion and the impact of falling stone from the cliffs directly above. The lower rock-cut portion has been heavily weathered by the sea, and some of the ground around them has collapsed; the portions where steps are lost have been replaced with ramps. A parapet at their lowest base was added in the 1820s, and they were widened during the construction of the lighthouse.

The south steps are most commonly used today and merge with the north steps at Christ's Saddle, to lead to the monastery. They cross several archaeological features, including a prayer station and walling. They are in good condition and were probably repaired by the lighthouse builders. Their weakest point, directly above Christ's Saddle, suffers wear and tear from continual use by modern visitors and require continual maintenance. The landing steps may have been built by the lighthouse builders; 14 steps apart from the main landing are virtually inaccessible, stopping short at both ends and leading neither to the sea nor to the highest levels.

The base of the east steps above Blind Man's Cove was heavily blasted with dynamite in 1820 during the construction of the pier and Lighthouse Road and are now inaccessible from the landing point. The steps above this level, on a very steep climb along a sheer face, have been subject to conservation, most recently in 2002/2003 when large amounts of overgrowth were removed, and they are today in good condition.

According to some reports, climate change in the form of increased rainfall and increase in sea swells/severity of storms is a threat to Skellig Michael, with tourism likely to be affected by climate change.

Monastery
It contains two oratories, a cemetery, crosses, cross-slabs, six clochán-type domed beehive cells (of which one has fallen) and a medieval church. The cells and oratories are all of dry-built corbel construction, whereas the church, which was constructed at a later date, is of mortared stone.

The year of the monastery's foundation is unknown. Like many early Christian remnants in Kerry, it is sometimes attributed to Saint Finnia, though this is doubted by historians. The first definite reference to monastic activity on the island is a record of the death of "Suibhini of Skelig" dating from the 8th century; however, Fionán is claimed to have founded the monastery in the 6th century.

The Annals of the Four Masters detail events at the Skelligs between the 9th and 11th centuries. These entries suggest that Eitgall of Skellig, the monastery's abbot, was taken by the Vikings in 823 and died of starvation thereafter. The Vikings again attacked in 838, sacking churches in Kenmare town, Skellig and Innisfallen Island. The Augustinian abbey in Ballinskelligs was founded in 950, the same year that Blathmhac of Sceilig died. Finally, the annals mention the death of Aedh of Sceilig Michael in 1040.

The largest hut, known as cell A, has a floor area of 14.5 × 3.8 metres, and is 5 metres high. Like the other huts, its internal walls are straight before narrowing to accommodate its dome roof. Protruding stones in the interior, acting as pegs, are placed at about 2.5 metres to support the roof, and in some instances may have supported upstairs living quarters. Protruding stones on the exterior most likely acted as anchors for thatch roofing. Some cells contain recesses that may have been formed to contain cupboards. The main oratory is boat-shaped, and measures 3.6 × 4.3 metres. It has an altar a small window on its eastern wall. The small oratory is situated on its own terrace, at a relative distance from the main complex. It measures 2.4 × 1.8 × 2.4 metres and contains a low door (0.9 × 0.5 metres) and a comparatively large, one-metre-high window on its north-eastern wall.

St. Michael's Church dates to the 10th or early 11th century. It was originally constructed from mostly lime mortar with imported sandstone from Valentia Island. It is today mostly collapsed, with only its eastern window still standing. The centre of the church contains a modern gravestone, dated 1871, erected for members of the family of one of the lighthouse keepers.

The Monk's Graveyard is partially collapsed and smaller than when it was in active use. It contains stone crosses with mostly plain inscribed decorative patterns on its west side, two of which are highly detailed and believed to be early features of the site; in total over a hundred individual stone crosses have been found on the island. There are several large orthostats on its north and west sides. There are two dry stone leachta on the site. The larger is positioned between Saint Michael's Church and the main Oratory, and is thought to pre-date both, and once had a large upright cross at its western end, which is now broken off. The other is located against the monastery retaining wall at the south of the oratory. Human remains have been found underneath both. 
 

It has been estimated that no more than twelve monks and an abbot lived at the monastery at any one time. The monastery was continuously occupied until the late 12th or early 13th century and remained a site for pilgrimage through to the modern era. The diet of the island monks was somewhat different from that of those on the mainland. With less arable land available to grow grain, vegetable gardens were an important part of monastic life. Of necessity, fish and the meat and eggs of birds nesting on the islands were staples. Theories for the site's abandonment include that the climate around Skellig Michael became colder and more prone to storms, Viking raids, and changes to the structure of the Irish Church. Probably a combination of these factors prompted the community to abandon the island and move to the abbey in Ballinskelligs. The move was recorded by the Cambro-Norman cleric and historian Giraldus Cambrensis at the end of the 12th century when he wrote that the monks had moved to a new site on the continent.

Hermitage
The hermitage is on the opposite side of the island to the monastery, below the south peak, and is significantly more difficult and hazardous to approach. Today, access to the south peak is restricted and only permitted after prior arrangement. It is approached from Christ's Saddle via a very narrow and steep series of rock-cut steps exposed on all sides to high winds, at times to near-hurricane force. The pathway passes through the Needle's Eye, a rock chimney formed by a narrow vertical crack in the peak. Though its origin and history are not as well studied as that of the monastery, the hermitage is thought to originate from the 9th century and comprises several enclosures and platforms situated on three main terraces cut into the rock. The terraces are known as the Oratory, Garden and Outer Terraces.

The oratory terrace, two hundred metres above sea level and fifteen metres below the summit, is the largest and is in good condition. The main oratory is still largely intact and contains its original altar, bench, a water cistern and what is likely the remnants of a shrine. The masonry work is typical of the Early Christian period in Ireland. It seems likely that the hermitage was built later than the monastery; given the presumed difficulty of its construction, which would have involved the movement of large pieces of stone up almost sheer cliff faces, the builders would have needed the monastery as a base. The eroding effect of frost on the island's major fault line provided the masons with large amounts of materials for the construction.

The interior of the main building measures 2.3 metres long and 1.2 metres wide. The enclosure wall is made from mostly small stones. Although it is now worn and mostly knocked down, it would once have been 1–1.5 metres high. The interior is today full of stone rubble fallen from the structure and the fragments of a 7-foot-tall stone cross. The leacht outside of it was probably used as a shrine or altar; it is too small to have been a burial site.

The outer terrace is situated on three stepped ledges some distance from the main complex and is difficult to access. Its only masonry consists of a 17-metre-long wall along its steep and exposed perimeter. Wondering why such an inaccessible and harsh outpost might have been built, the historian Walter Horn wrote that "the goal of an ascetic was not comfort" and recalled that the Cambrai Homily states: "This is our denial of ourselves, if we do not indulge our desires and if we abjure our sins. This is our taking-up of our cross upon us if we receive loss and martyrdom and suffering for Christ's sake."

Post-monastic
Skellig Michael remained in the possession of the Catholic Canons Regular until the dissolution of Ballinskelligs Abbey in 1578, a result of the reformation by Elizabeth I. Ownership of the islands passed to the Butler family (for rental of "two hawks and a quantity of puffin feathers yearly"), with whom it stayed until the early 1820s when the Corporation for Preserving and Improving the Port of Dublin (predecessor to the Commissioners of Irish Lights) purchased the island for £500 from John Butler of Waterville in a compulsory purchase order. The corporation constructed two lighthouses on the Atlantic side of the island, and associated living quarters, all of which was completed by 1826.

In 1871, Lord Dunraven, in his Notes on Irish Architecture, made the first comprehensive archaeological survey of the island. Describing the monastery, he wrote "the scene is one so solemn and so sad that none should enter here but the pilgrim and the penitent. The sense of solitude, the vast heaven above and the sublime monotonous motion of the sea beneath would oppress the spirit, were not that spirit brought into harmony." He was less charitable of the lighthouse project and described their alterations as attributed to "the lighthouse workmen who...in 1838, built some objectionable modern walls". The Office of Public Works took the remains of the monastery into guardianship in 1880, before purchasing the island (with the exception of the lighthouses and associated structures) from the Commissioners of Irish Lights.

Skellig Michael was made a World Heritage Site in 1996.  The International Council on Monuments and Sites (an advisory body of the World Heritage Committee) described Skellig Michael as of "exceptional universal value", and a "unique example of an early religious settlement", while also noting the site's preservation as a result of its "remarkable environment", and its ability to illustrate "as no other site can, the extremes of a Christian monasticism characterising much of North Africa, the Near East and Europe".

In culture
Several films and documentaries have used the island as a filming location. The island was used as a filming location in Star Wars: The Force Awakens (2015) and Star Wars: The Last Jedi (2017). Aerial footage of the island was also used in Star Wars: The Rise of Skywalker (2019). It also served as a location for the final scene in Heart of Glass (1976), and in Byzantium (2012).

In the first episode of the 1969 BBC documentary Civilisation: A Personal View by Kenneth Clark, art historian Kenneth Clark described the island's buildings and pathways as "an extraordinary achievement of courage and tenacity". He observed that "looking back from the great civilizations of twelfth-century France or seventeenth-century Rome, it is hard to believe, that for quite a long time—almost a hundred years—western Christianity survived by clinging to places like Skellig Michael, a pinnacle of rock eighteen miles from the Irish coast, rising  out of the sea".

Access and tourism

Skellig Michael contains three landing points variously used by monks depending on the weather conditions. Today the island receives an average of 11,000 visitors per year. To protect the site, the Office of Public Works limits the number of visitors to 180 per day. The local climate and exposed terrain make the crossing from the mainland to Skellig Michael difficult. Once landed, the island's terrain is steep, unprotected and dangerous. The rock is ascended via 600 medieval stone steps leading towards the main island peak.

This remoteness and inaccessibility has long discouraged visitors, so the island is exceptionally well preserved. Tourism began in the late 19th century when a rowing boat could be hired for 25 shillings. It did not become a popular tourist destination until the early 1970s when small chartered passenger boats became more frequent; five were available in 1973 at a price of £3 per person. By 1990, the level of demand had grown to the extent that the Office of Public Works began to organise ten boats departing from four individual harbours.

Each year at least four boat licences are granted to tour operators who run trips to Skellig Michael during the summer season (May to October, inclusive), weather permitting. Even when conditions on the mainland are calm, the sea around the island can be turbulent. The area is a landing point for sea swells travelling in from distant depressions in the Atlantic. The island is lashed by water from all sides, with wave crests breaking at up to 10 metres over the pier and 45 metres along the lighthouse. When such large wave troughs recede, they can often expose ragged seaweed stumps, sponges and anemones on the rock faces, further hampering approach and landing.

A typical visit lasts about six hours. The Office of Public Works emphasises that the journey presents safety challenges. For safety reasons, mainly because the steps are steep, rocky, old and unprotected, climbs are not permitted during wet or windy weather. Dive sites immediately around the rock, mostly around Blue Cove, are permitted in summer.

Gallery

Notes

References

 
 
 
 
 
 
 
 
 
 
 
 
 
 
 
 
 
 
 
 
 
 
 
 
 
 
 
 
 
 
 The Skelligs (Book, 1980s) (WorldCat.org)

External links

 UNESCO World Heritage Centre – Skellig Michael
 Sceilg Mhichíl UNESCO Collection on Google Arts and Culture
 Skellig Michael Virtual reality tour for e-learning and people with limited mobility by Burger Landmarks

Archaeological sites in County Kerry
Christian monasteries in the Republic of Ireland
Former populated places in Ireland
Michael (archangel)
National Monuments in County Kerry
Peaks dedicated to Michael (archangel)
Ruins in the Republic of Ireland
Skellig Islands
Uninhabited islands of Ireland
World Heritage Sites in the Republic of Ireland